Too Far Gone is the second studio album from Australian country music artist Catherine Britt, released on 16 January 2006. It peaked in the top 50 of the ARIA Albums Charts and No. 3 on the ARIA Country Albums Chart. It was co-produced by Bill Chambers and Keith Stegall. At the ARIA Music Awards of 2006 Britt received a nomination for Best Country Album for Too Far Gone.

"The Upside of Being Down" was released as a single in the United States in August 2004, where it was promoted by RCA Records. It reached the top 60 on the US Billboard Hot Country Songs chart. Australian singles released from the album were "Poor Man's Pride" (2005), "Swingin' Door" (2006) and the title track (2006). Two cover versions are included on the album, "Wrapped" by Bruce Robison as the title track of his 1998 album, and "Life's Highway" by Steve Wariner from his 1986 album of the same name.

Reception 

Jeff Glorfeld of The Age observed, "it becomes evident she is serious about her music, showing classical influences such as Hank Williams and Loretta Lynn... The voice is rich if generic, and the songs are mostly from the honkytonk heartache, you-done-me-wrong perspective, which sounds a bit silly coming from this kid, but Britt's wry self-awareness makes it work. It's good fun."

Comcasts Tim Noel felt "[it] may not be strong enough to share with your friends as far as an introduction to [Britt]. There is some strong material here such as 'Swingin' Door' and 'Poor Man's Pride', but it's filled with mediocre stuff that sounds like late 90s material... I know Britt has a more rocking side that should hopefully come out in her upcoming [album]." Amazon.com editorial review includes, "an exquisitely crafted collection of powerful and moving songs, mostly written by Catherine."

Track listing

Charts

References 

2006 albums
Catherine Britt albums